"Never a Time" is the fifth track from English rock band Genesis's 14th studio album, We Can't Dance (1991). This song, a ballad, was released as the fifth single from the album, and reached No. 4 on the US Billboard Hot Adult Contemporary Tracks chart while also peaking at No. 21 on the Billboard Hot 100 and No. 9 in Canada, becoming their final top-40 hit in the former country.

Personnel
 Tony Banks – keyboards
 Phil Collins – vocals, drums, percussion 
 Mike Rutherford – electric guitars, bass guitar

Charts

Weekly charts

Year-end charts

References

1990s ballads
1991 songs
1992 singles
Atlantic Records singles
Genesis (band) songs
Songs written by Mike Rutherford
Songs written by Phil Collins
Songs written by Tony Banks (musician)
Virgin Records singles